Derek Bond is a British theatre director and writer who has directed at Royal Exchange Theatre, Southwark Playhouse, Soho Theatre and Watford Palace Theatre.

Awards

|-
| 2022
| Dragons and Mythical Beasts
| Olivier Award - Best Family Show
|  
|-
| 2017
| Sweet Charity
| UK Theatre Awards - Best Musical
|  
|-
| 2017
| Sweet Charity
| Manchester Theatre Awards - Best Musical
|  
|-
| 2015
| Little Shop of Horrors
| Manchester Theatre Awards - Best Musical
|  
|-
| 2012
| Floyd Collins
| Evening Standard Awards, Ned Sherrin Award for Best Musical
| 
|-
| 2012
| Floyd Collins
| Off West End Awards, Best Musical
|

Selected work
 Dragons and Mythical Beasts by Derek Bond at the Open Air Theatre, Regent's Park
 The Christmasaurus by Tom Fletcher at the Hammersmith Apollo
 Sweet Charity at the Royal Exchange, Manchester, opened on 3 December 2016.
 Jess and Joe Forever by Zoe Cooper at the Orange Tree Theatre followed by a UK tour, then at the Traverse Theatre
 Stig of the Dump adapted by Jessica Swale at the Grosvenor Park Open Air Theatre
 Little Shop of Horrors at the Royal Exchange Theatre, Manchester
 Floyd Collins (musical) at Southwark Playhouse
 Many Moons by Alice Birch at Theatre503

References

Year of birth missing (living people)
Living people
British theatre directors